Nadia Podoroska was the defending champion but chose not to participate.

Viktorija Golubic won the title, defeating Jasmine Paolini in the final, 6–1, 6–3.

Seeds

Draw

Finals

Top half

Bottom half

Qualifying

Seeds

Qualifiers

Lucky loser

Draw

First qualifier

Second qualifier

Third qualifier

Fourth qualifier

References

External links
Main draw
Qualifying draw

2021 WTA 125 tournaments
2021 L'Open 35 de Saint-Malo - 1